"Hooves of Fire" is one of three animated BBC Christmas comedy television specials, filmed using stop motion techniques, and presented in 1999 in aid of Comic Relief.

Story 
Robbie, son of Rudolph the Red-Nosed Reindeer, arrives at Coldchester, town of the North Pole to follow in his father's hoofprints of being a navigator for Santa Claus's sleigh team. Unlike Rudolph's glowing nose, Robbie's possesses a GPS that can find anything. Upon arriving at the team's home, Reindeer Lodge, he meets several members of the team; Donner; a young female reindeer who's secretly attracted to him, Prancer; a hip, friendly and overweight reindeer, Vixen; an attractive but apathetic reindeer whom Robbie falls for, and Blitzen; the captain of the sleigh team and Vixen's boyfriend. Blitzen, embittered from Rudolph's sudden popularity after saving Christmas, plans to prevent Robbie from being part of the sleigh team out of vengeance. Blitzen encourages Robbie to continue slacking off, claiming that Santa will accept him on the team regardless of fitness out of respect for Rudolph.

During a Christmas party at Santa's house, Santa shows off a new modified sleigh design, which includes a built-in GPS system. Fearing his place on the team gone, Robbie is assured by Santa that he still has a place, granted he isn't unfit by then. Blitzen guilts Robbie into leaving after saying Rudolph will receive the blame for his son causing a late Christmas.

After being found frozen in the snow by some elves, Robbie pleads to work with them at their toy factory. Through accidents and lack of concentration, Robbie is demoted from working on the assembly line, to sweeping, and to being used as a forklift. Donner later finds Robbie and reveals to him Blitzen's true intentions to rid Robbie from the team and says that he can get back on the team if he wins a medal at The Reindeer Games. She encourages him to repursue getting fit under the instruction of his father's former coach, Old Jingle, a mad elderly reindeer who lives in a teetering house atop Pointy Mountain. Jingle instructs that Robbie only needs to compete in and win the Steeplechase to solidify a position on the team. In the span of a month, Robbie gets into shape and learns 'The Nose Jump' just in time for the Reindeer Games.

Blitzen is shocked to see Robbie at the event and watches as he saves Santa's infant son from being crushed by a falling walrus tenor. In an attempt to ensure that Blitzen wins the Steeplechase, Vixen tries to convince Robbie not to compete out of his attraction to her. Robbie refuses, having now fallen for Donner instead.

Before the event starts, Robbie is forced to leave the race course to rescue Old Jingle, who got trapped underneath his house after attempting to push it back up Pointy Mountain. Robbie manages to rescue Jingle using some toys he made at the toy factory prior. While immensely behind in the race, Robbie manages to quickly catch back up to Blitzen, who tries to prevent him from winning by making him crash into one of hurdles. After coming to his senses from the crash, Robbie uses the nose jump to catch back up to Blitzen. A photo finish unfortunately reveals Blitzen to be the victor, but he is later disqualified and arrested after the discovery of his use of performance-enhancing drugs, resulting in Vixen ending their relationship. Donner, being proud of Robbie, kisses him after the race, who promptly goes on to beat every record in every other event in his happiness. Santa later gives Robbie the keys to his sleigh to take Donner on a romantic night out to the Moon.

In scenes during the credits, Prancer plays air guitar with a tennis racket, Vixen attempts to hitchhike out of the North Pole, Blitzen is seen begrudgingly serving his community service by painting dolls of Robbie and Santa puts his underwear on a washing line.

Voices
This UK animation has been aired in both America and Britain. Each had its own dubbing.

British
In the original British production, Robbie was voiced by Ardal O'Hanlon. Other voices were provided by Jane Horrocks (Donner), Steve Coogan (Blitzen), Caroline Quentin (Vixen), Ricky Tomlinson (Santa), Paul Whitehouse (Prancer), Harry Enfield (Old Jingle), Sean Hughes (Tapir), Seal as a singing seal performing "Crazy", and impressionist Alistair McGowan taking off Alan Hansen (portrayed as a snowman), Tony Anscombe as Elf 3 and Des Lynam (as a yeti).

American
The program was first shown in the United States on Fox Family with the original British voices until 2001. CBS then acquired the rights and began airing the special in 2002. However, the program was redubbed with American accents. Ben Stiller voiced Robbie, while other voices included Britney Spears (Donner), Leah Remini (Vixen), Hugh Grant (Blitzen; Grant used his usual British accent, largely imitating Coogan's original characterization), Dick Enberg and Dan Dierdorf (Allen Snowman and Des Yeti, parodying Enberg and Dierdorf's NFL on CBS roles), Brad Garrett (Prancer), and Stiller's father Jerry (Jingle and a talking garbage bag).

Awards
Hooves of Fire won the 2000 BAFTA for Best Entertainment (Programme or Series). It was also honored at the 3rd International Festival of Animated Feature Films and TV Specials where it won the prize for Best TV Special.

References

BBC television comedy
Christmas television specials
Comic Relief
1999 in British television